Sabunçu (also, Sabunchi and Sabunchy) is a settlement and municipality in Baku, Azerbaijan. It has a population of 22,344.

History
Until the beginning of the 20th century, the Sabunçu region was producing 35 percent of Baku's oil. It was also the place where the first, Baku-Sabunchu electrified railway system in USSR, built by Chingiz Ildyrym in 1924 was established.

Geography
The town, seat of Sabunçu raion, is located in the north-eastern suburb of the city of Baku and is part of its metropolitan area, situated 12 km from Baku International Airport "Heydar Aliyev".

Notable natives 
 Nikolai Baibakov — People's Commissar of the USSR Oil Industry (1944–1946), Oil Minister of the USSR (1948–1955), Hero of Socialist Labor.
 Richard Sorge — one of the best-known Soviet intelligence officers of the Second World War, Hero of the Soviet Union.
Igor Ashurbeyli
Ashurbeyov-Well-known family

References 

Populated places in Baku